The Codex Vaticanus (in Latin, "Vatican's codex") is one of the oldest and most valuable extant manuscripts of the Greek Bible (Gregory number: B/03). In addition to that most common reference, however, the term may refer to any other of the (thousands of) manuscripts preserved in the Vatican Library, a partial list of which follows:

Manuscripts of Aristotle 
 Codex Vaticanus 253, manuscript of the On the Soul of Aristotle, 13th century
 Codex Vaticanus 260, manuscript of the On the Soul of Aristotle, 11th century
 Codex Vaticanus 266, manuscript of the On the Soul of Aristotle, 14th century
 Codex Vaticanus 1026, manuscript of the On the Soul of Aristotle, 13th century
 Codex Vaticanus 1339, manuscript of the On the Soul of Aristotle, 14th-15th century

Manuscripts of Catullus 
 Codex Vaticanus Ottobonianus Latinus 1829, late 14th century

Manuscripts of the Bible 
 Codex Vaticanus 354, a Greek manuscript of the Gospels
 Codex Vaticanus 2061, a Greek manuscript of the Acts, Catholic epistles, and Pauline epistles written on vellum
 Codex Vaticanus 2066, a Greek manuscript of the Book of Revelation written on vellum
 Codex Vaticanus gr. 2061, uncial manuscript of the four Gospels
 Codex Vaticanus gr. 665, minuscule manuscript of the New Testament
 Codex Vaticanus Palatinus 220, minuscule manuscript of the New Testament
 Codex Vaticanus gr. 2125, uncial manuscript of Septuaginta
 Codex Vaticanus Gr. 2302, uncial manuscript of the Acts

Manuscripts of Virgil 
 Codex Vaticanus Latinus 3256, 4th century
 Codex Vaticanus Latinus 3225, early 5th century
 Codex Vaticanus Latinus 3867, 5th century

Renaissance manuscripts 
 Codex Vaticanus Latinus 5314, dated 7 December 1451, contains a copy of Lorenzo Valla's treatise on the Donation of Constantine

Other 
 Codex Vaticanus Graecus 64, dated to 1270, contains Socrates Letters
 Codex Vaticanus 3868

Mesoamerican manuscripts 
 Codex Ríos, known as Codex Vaticanus A, or Codex Vaticanus 3738
 Codex Vaticanus B, Codex Vaticanus 3773, Aztec ritual document